Mercury Aviation Company was one of the first commercial airline services founded in 1919 by Cecil B. DeMille. DeMille, Hollywood American film director and producer, was one of the first to see the aircraft's potential in commercial airline service. At first Mercury Aviation flew World War I surplus Curtiss JN-4 Jenny for sightseeing and charter flights from DeMille Field No. 1 and then later purchased passenger planes. DeMille restored a World War I plane in 1917. Mercury Aviation Company did not make a profit and closed in 1922 after two years of operation. Al Wilson was DeMille's flight instructor and became the manager of the company for a short time.

Air Service
Mercury Aviation Company's Mercury Air Lines started regular scheduled flights in May 1921. Mercury Aviation Company offered flights to Santa Catalina Island, San Diego, and San Francisco. Other cities were added to the airline service. Mercury Aviation Company thus became the first airline service to offer flights to multiple destinations. Over 25,000 passengers were transported in the two years of Mercury Aviation Company operation. Mercury Aviation Company closed in 1922 with no crashes in its two years of operation.

DeMille Field No. 1 

DeMille Field No. 1 built by Cecil B. DeMille in 1918, located at the southwest corner of Melrose Avenue and Fairfax Avenue, Fairfax was called Crescent Avenue in the 1920s. In 1920 he closed DeMille Field No. 1 and move to DeMille Field No. 2. The DeMille Field No. 1 site is now houses in the Fairfax District, Los Angeles.

DeMille Field No. 2 

DeMille Field No. 2 also called Mercury Field  was at the northwest corner of Lindenhurst Ave and Fairfax Avenue, Fairfax was called Crescent Avenue in the 1920s. Cecil B. DeMille's Mercury Aviation Company purchased a Junkers-Larsen JL-6 aircraft in August 1920 and start his commercial airline. Eddie Rickenbacker, World War 1 ace delivered the new JL-6 to DeMille Field No. 2. Before operating the JL-6, Mercury Aviation flew World War I surplus Curtiss JN-4 Jenny for sightseeing, US Mail, cargo and charter flights.

Cecil B. DeMille used DeMille Field No. 2 for some of his silent picture films. In August 1920 two stunt pilots were killed at DeMille Field No. 2: Ormer "Lock" Locklear and Milton "Skeets" Elliott, the making of The Skywayman.  Mercury Aviation Company had a unique gas station at Fairfax and Wilshire. One side filled up cars the other side filled up aircraft. DeMille Field No. 2 was the site of the first passenger plane to land from New York City. 

The airport closed in 1930, as Mercury was not profitable. The site is now housing in the Fairfax District.

Eaton Altadena
The airport also served nearby Pasadena, California. Eaton Altadena had much less service than Field No. 2. The site is now the Altadena Town & Country Club.

See also 
 List of defunct airlines of the United States
 The Flying Mail
 The Air Patrol
 The Cloud Dodger
 Mercury Air Line Holdings, Florida

References

Airlines disestablished in 1919
Airlines established in 1930
Defunct airlines of the United States
1919 establishments in California
1930 disestablishments in California
American companies disestablished in 1919
American companies established in 1919
Airlines based in California